Martin J. Platz was a Canadian football player who played for the Winnipeg Blue Bombers. He won the Grey Cup with them in 1939.

He was the son of Leo Platz, had brothers Waldemar and Paul, and sisters Margaret, Helen and Ruth. He served in World War II with the Royal Canadian Air Force. In August 1941, he was reported as being held as a prisoner of war, having been missing since July 7, 1941. In 1947, he was living in Hamilton, Ontario.

References

Canadian football ends
Winnipeg Blue Bombers players
Canadian prisoners of war in World War II
Royal Canadian Air Force personnel of World War II